Jonah Burt (born 5 September 1994) is a Canadian judoka. He competed in the men's 81 kg event at the 2014 Commonwealth Games 
 where he won a bronze medal.

References

External links

1994 births
Living people
Canadian male judoka
Commonwealth Games bronze medallists for Canada
Commonwealth Games medallists in judo
Judoka at the 2014 Commonwealth Games
Judoka at the 2015 Pan American Games
People from Ajax, Ontario
Sportspeople from Ontario
Pan American Games competitors for Canada
20th-century Canadian people
21st-century Canadian people
Medallists at the 2014 Commonwealth Games